Emmanouíl Karalís, born 20 October 1999 in Athens, is a Greek pole vaulter. He is the son of a Greek father from Pyrgos, and a Ugandan mother.
He won the silver medal at the 2019 and 2021 European Athletics U23 Championships and placed fourth at the 2020 Summer Olympics.
He has a twin sister, named Angeliki.

Honours

References

External links

1999 births
Living people
Athletes from Athens
Greek male pole vaulters
Greek people of Ugandan descent
Athletes (track and field) at the 2020 Summer Olympics
Greek twins
Olympic athletes of Greece
21st-century Greek people